The Feeding is a 2006 film written and directed by Paul Moore.

Plot summary
A werewolf pursues campers in the Appalachian Mountains. Consumed by its legendary bloodlust, the creature begins the hunt for its oldest and most dangerous prey: Man. Special Agent Jack Driscoll has seen this before. The beast is his obsession and his nightmare. Now, he and his new partner must race against the rising moon to save a group of unsuspecting campers. Outmatched and unarmed, the frightened group must rally themselves to survive the night. As their numbers dwindle and their strength wanes, the group scrambles to answer the only question that will save their lives; how do you kill the unkillable?

Cast

 Kara Maria Amedon as Cynthia
 Robert Pralgo as Jack Driscoll
 Sam Blankenship as Ranger#2
 Barry Ellenberger as Ranger#1 / Werewolf
 Ben Green as Phil
 Lucas N. Hall as Hunter #1
 Courtney Hogan as Reagan
 Lynnili James as Elle
 Jennifer Leigh as Elizabeth
 Andrew Porter as Allen
 Ben Reed as Clive Burnell
 Rod Shephard as Ty
 Hektor Stockton as dying werewolf
 Dione J Updike as Aimee
 David Winning as Hunter #2

External links

The Feeding at Bum's Corner

References

2006 films
American werewolf films
2006 horror films
2000s English-language films
2000s American films